Nassaria is a genus of sea snails, marine gastropod mollusks in the subfamily Tomliniinae of the family Nassariidae.

Taxonomy 
This genus was treated within family Buccinidae. It was moved to family Nassariidae in 2016.

Type species
The issue regarding type species of the genus Nassaria Link, 1807 is confusing. Cernohorsky (1981) and Fraussen (2006) assume “Nassaria lyrata Link, 1807”. Considering other instances in Link (1807), this latter name is expected to represent a new combination for Buccinum lyratum Gmelin, 1791, not as a separately available new taxon. Link’s (1807) original reference reads “N. lyrata. L. G. p. 3494. M.C. 4, t. 122, f. 1122, 1123“ [”L.G.” stands for Linnaeus, Gmelin edition and M.C. For Martini & Chemnitz’s “Conchylien Cabinet”].

Nevertheless, as pointed out by Mörch (1862), MacNeil (1961), and others, the two cited references are inconsistent. Gmelin’s Buccinum lyratum is introduced on pp. 3494–3495, and currently considered as a synonym of Boreotrophon clathratus (Linnaeus, 1767) whereas the reference to Martini & Chemnitz (1780), vol. 4, t. 122, f. 1122, 1123 matches Buccinum album Gmelin, 1791, described on page 3495 with reference to the same figures. The vernacular name “Fischreuseschnecken” (a German translation of Nassa snails) used by Link matches “Fischreuse” used by Martini & Chemnitz for f. 1122, 1123, indicating that the latter was the species really intended. This is the rationale for the current interpretation, where Nassaria lyrata Link, 1807 is considered an available name based on Martini & Chemnitz f. 1122, 1123 and objective junior synonym of Buccinum album Gmelin, 1791.

Species
Species within the genus Nassaria include:

 Nassaria acuminata (Reeve, 1881)
 Nassaria acutispirata (G.B. Sowerby III, 1913)
 Nassaria amboynensis Watson, 1881
 Nassaria bitubercularis(A. Adams, 1851) 
 Nassaria bombax Cernohorsky, 1981
 Nassaria callomoni Poppe, Tagaro & Fraussen, 2008
 Nassaria corollaria Fraussen, 2006
 Nassaria coromandelica E.A.Smith, 1894
 † Nassaria dijki (K. Martin, 1884) 
 Nassaria exquisita Fraussen & Poppe, 2007
 Nassaria fibula Fraussen & Stahlschmidt, 2008
 Nassaria gracilis G.B. Sowerby III, 1902
 Nassaria gyroscopoides Fraussen & Poppe, 2007
 † Nassaria incerta (L. C. King, 1933) 
 Nassaria incisa Fraussen, 2006
 Nassaria intacta Fraussen, 2006
 Nassaria laevior E.A. Smith, 1899
 Nassaria magnifica Lischke, 1871
 Nassaria miriamae (Dell, 1967)  
 Nassaria moosai Fraussen, 2006
 Nassaria nassoides (Griffith & Pidgeon, 1834) 
 Nassaria nebulonis Fraussen, Dharma & Stahlschmidt, 2009
 Nassaria okinavia (Mac Neil, 1960)
 Nassaria perlata Poppe & Fraussen, 2004
 Nassaria problematica (Iredale, 1936)
 Nassaria pusilla (Röding, 1798)
 Nassaria recurva G.B. Sowerby II, 1859
 Nassaria rickardi (Ladd, 1977)
 Nassaria sinensis G.B. Sowerby II, 1859
 Nassaria solida Kuroda & Habe in Habe, 1961
 Nassaria spinigera (Hayashi & Habe, 1965)
 Nassaria tarta Fraussen, 2006
 Nassaria teres Martens, 1902
 Nassaria termesoides Fraussen, 2006
 Nassaria thalassomeli Fraussen & Poppe, 2007
 Nassaria thesaura Fraussen & Poppe, 2007
 Nassaria turbinata (Kuroda, 1961)
 Nassaria varicosa S.-Q. Zhang & S.-P. Zhang, 2014
 Nassaria vermeiji Fraussen & Stahlschmidt, 2015
 Nassaria visayensis Fraussen & Poppe, 2007
 Nassaria wallacei Fraussen, 2006
 † Nassaria wanneri (Tesch in Wanner, 1915)

Species brought into synonymy 
 Nassaria auritula Link, 1807: synonym of Gemophos auritulus (Link, 1807)
 Nassaria bushii Dall, 1889: synonym  of Nassarina bushiae (Dall, 1889)
 Nassaria cirsiumoides Fraussen, 2004: synonym of Phaenomenella cirsiumoides (Fraussen, 2004)
 Nassaria columbellata Dall, 1889: synonym of Metulella columbellata (Dall, 1889)
 Nassaria kampyla Watson, 1885: synonym  of Sassia kampyla (Watson, 1885)
 Nassaria laevier [sic]: synonym of Nassaria laevior E. A. Smith, 1899
 Nassaria lyrata Link, 1807: synonym of Nassaria pusilla (Röding, 1798)
 Nassaria mordica Hedley, 1909 : synonym  of Orania fischeriana (Tapparone-Canefri, 1882)
 Nassaria multiplicata G. B. Sowerby II, 1859: synonym of Nassaria pusilla (Röding, 1798)

References

 MacNeil F. S. (1961 ["1960"]) Tertiary and Quaternary Gastropoda of Okinawa. United States Geological Survey Professional Paper 339: iv + 148 pp., 21 pls.
 Vaught, K.C. (1989). A classification of the living Mollusca. American Malacologists: Melbourne, FL (USA). . XII, 195 pp

External links
 Link D.H.F. (1807-1808) Beschreibung der Naturalien-Sammlung der Universität zu Rostock. 1 Abt. [Part 1], pp. 1–50; 2 Abt. [Part 2], pp. 51–100; 3 Abt. [Part 3], pp. 101–165; Abt. 4 [Part 4], pp. 1–30; Abt. 5 [Part 5], pp. 1–38 [1808]; Abt. 6 [Part 6], pp. 1–38 [1808] Rostock, Adlers Erben
 Dall, W. H. (1916). Prodrome of a revision of the chrysodomoid whelks of the boreal and arctic regions. Proceedings of the Biological Society of Washington. 29: 7-8.
 Adams, A. (1855). Descriptions of new genera and species of gasteropodous Mollusca. Proceedings of the Zoological Society of London. (1853) 21: 182-186
  Iredale, T. (1936). Australian molluscan notes, no. 2. Records of the Australian Museum. 19(5): 267-340, pls 20-24
 Mörch, O. A. L. (1863). On the genera of Mollusca established by H.F. Link in the Catalogue of the Rostock Museum. Proceedings of the Zoological Society of London. 1862: 226-228
  Galindo, L. A.; Puillandre, N.; Utge, J.; Lozouet, P.; Bouchet, P. (2016). The phylogeny and systematics of the Nassariidae revisited (Gastropoda, Buccinoidea). Molecular Phylogenetics and Evolution. 99: 337-353
 Eames, F. E. (1952). A contribution to the study of the Eocene in Western Pakistan and Western India C. The description of the Scaphopoda and Gastropoda from standard sections in the Rakhi Nala and Zinda Pir areas of the western Punjab and in the Kohat District. Philosophical Transactions of the Royal Society of London. Series B, Biological Sciences. 236 (631): 1-168, pl. 1-6.

Nassariidae